Anona is a place in Jipijapa, Manabí Province, Ecuador, South America.

References

Populated places in Manabí Province